Mare Liberum (or The Freedom of the Seas) is a book in Latin on international law written by the Dutch jurist and philosopher Hugo Grotius, first published in 1609. In The Free Sea, Grotius formulated the new principle that the sea was international territory and all nations were free to use it for seafaring trade. The disputation was directed towards the Portuguese Mare clausum policy and their claim of monopoly on the East Indian Trade. Grotius wrote the treatise while being a counsel to the Dutch East India Company over the seizing of the Santa Catarina Portuguese carrack issue.
The work was assigned to Grotius by the Zeeland Chamber of the Dutch East India Company in 1608.

Grotius' argument was that the sea was free to all, and that nobody had the right to deny others access to it. In chapter I, he laid out his objective, which was to demonstrate "briefly and clearly that the Dutch [...] have the right to sail to the East Indies", and, also, "to engage in trade with the people there". He then went on to describe how he based his argument on what he called the "most specific and unimpeachable axiom of the Law of Nations, called a primary rule or first principle, the spirit of which is self-evident and immutable", namely that: "Every nation is free to travel to every other nation, and to trade with it." From this premise, Grotius argued that this self-evident and immutable right to travel and to trade required (1) a right of innocent passage over land, and (2) a similar right of innocent passage at sea. The sea, however, was more like air than land, and was, as opposed to land, common property of all:

Mare Liberum was published by Elzevier in the spring of 1609. It has been translated into English twice. The first translation was by Richard Hakluyt, and was completed some time between the publication of Mare Liberum in 1609 and Hakluyt's death in 1616. However, Hakluyt's translation was only  published for the first time in 2004 under the title The Free Sea as part of Liberty Fund's "Natural Law and Enlightenment Classics" series. The second translation was by Ralph Van Deman Magoffin, associate professor of Greek and Roman History at Johns Hopkins University. This translation was a part of a debate on free shipping during the First World War, and was published by the Carnegie Endowment for International Peace and Oxford University Press in 1916 as The Freedom of the Seas, Or, The Right Which Belongs to the Dutch to Take Part in the East Indian Trade.

Notes

References

Further reading
 Borschberg, Peter, "Hugo Grotius' Theory of Trans-Oceanic Trade Regulation: Revisiting Mare Liberum (1609), Itinerario 23, 3 (2005): 31-53. DOI: https://doi.org/10.1017/S0165115300010469
 Borschberg, Peter, Hugo Grotius, the Portuguese and Free Trade in the East Indies, Singapore and Leiden: Singapore University Press and KITLV Press, 2011.
 Ittersum, Martine Julia van, "Preparing Mare Liberum for the Press: Hugo Grotius’ Rewriting of Chapter 12 of De iure praedae in November–December 1608", Grotiana, New Series, 27–8 (2005–7): 246–80.

External links 
 The First Edition of Mare Liberum in the de Koninklijke Bibliotheek
 The 1648 Ex Officina ELZEVIRIANA edition of Mare Liberum,  Sive De iure quod Batavis competit ad Indicana commercia Dissertatio, republished by Elsevier B.V. in 2013 with 
 Mare Liberum (1609) and The Freedom of the Seas (1916) – HTML and PDF versions at Liberty Fund
 The Freedom of the Seas (1916) – formatted PDF at the Wikimedia Commons
 The Story of Mankind (1921), pg. 272

1609 books
Books by Hugo Grotius
International waters
Legal history of the Dutch Republic
Philosophy and thought in the Dutch Republic
1609 in law